Windows Phone 8.x may refer to:

 Windows Phone 8
 Windows Phone 8.1

See also
 Windows 8.x

8.